Franco Cacioni (born 6 January 1933) is a former Venezuelan cyclist. He competed in the three events at the 1956 Summer Olympics.

References

External links
 

1933 births
Living people
Venezuelan male cyclists
Olympic cyclists of Venezuela
Cyclists at the 1956 Summer Olympics
Cyclists from Rome
Italian male cyclists
Italian emigrants to Venezuela